Indigenous Black Canadians is a term for people in Canada of African descent who have roots in Canada going back several generations. The term has been proposed to distinguish them from Black people with more recent immigrant roots. Popularized by Black Canadian leaders such as Rinaldo Walcott, Walter Borden, George Elliott Clarke, and Rocky Jones, the earliest use of the term goes back to the 1970s when Canada began receiving a large influx of immigrants from the Caribbean.

See also

North Buxton, Ontario
Amber Valley, Alberta
Hogan's Alley, Vancouver
Elm Hill, New Brunswick
Africville
African Nova Scotians

References

 
 
Canadians
Ethnic groups in Canada
Canadian people of African descent